Elisha Harrison "Camp" Skinner (June 25, 1897 – August 4, 1944) was a professional baseball outfielder. He was a reserve player and pinch hitter for the 1922 New York Yankees and 1923 Boston Red Sox of Major League Baseball (MLB).

Biography
Skinner's minor league career spanned 1921 to 1928, with gaps, as he did not play professionally in 1925 or 1927.

His major league career consisted of 27 games for the New York Yankees in 1922, and seven games for the Boston Red Sox in 1923. Prior to the 1923 season, he was traded by New York along with infielder Norm McMillan, pitcher George Murray, and cash to Boston in exchange for pitcher Herb Pennock. Overall, Skinner recorded a .196 batting average with no home runs and three RBIs. Most of his appearances were as a pinch hitter, as he only made six defensive appearances in the outfield (four for New York and two for Boston); he was not charged with any errors.

Skinner was born in Douglasville, Georgia. He died at the age of 47 in his hometown and was buried there.

Notes

References

Further reading

External links

1897 births
1944 deaths
Boston Red Sox players
New York Yankees players
Dallas Submarines players
Shreveport Gassers players
Lincoln Links players
Des Moines Boosters players
Beaumont Exporters players
Dallas Steers players
Bloomington Bloomers players
Ottumwa Packers players
Moline Plowboys players
Major League Baseball outfielders
Baseball players from Georgia (U.S. state)
United States Army personnel of World War I
Cedartown Cedars players